Oxenholme Lake District railway station in Oxenholme, near Kendal, Cumbria, England, is on the West Coast Main Line and at the start of the Windermere Branch Line to Windermere. The station, which serves as a main line connection point for Kendal and Windermere, is managed by Avanti West Coast and owned by Network Rail.

History
The station was constructed as part of the Lancaster and Carlisle Railway (which is now a section on the West Coast Main Line from London to Glasgow). Initially the railway was earmarked to go via Kendal. However, a  tunnel would have had to have been built north of the town to accommodate this route. The line between Lancaster and Oxenholme opened in September 1846. This ended when the line to Carlisle was completed in December 1847.

With the decision to avoid Kendal, the Kendal and Windermere Railway was promoted instead with Oxenholme becoming a junction station. It opened in April 1847.

The station's popularity with visitors to The Lakes was fictionalised by Arthur Ransome in the Swallows and Amazons series of children's books, where it was renamed Strickland Junction. In Pigeon Post Roger releases a homing pigeon there.

Incidents
On 10 February 1965, fugitive John Middleton, who was hiding in the waiting room, shot and killed Carlisle policeman Alex Archibald at the station. His colleague, George Russell, who was also shot, died a few hours later in hospital.

On 27 May 2006 a 19-year-old man was fatally stabbed aboard a Glasgow-Paignton train as it was entering the station. A 22-year-old man was jailed for 21 years for the murder in November 2006.

The Grayrigg rail crash happened on 23 February 2007 when a Class 390 Pendolino derailed shortly after it had left Oxenholme Lake District railway station; one person died and 22 others were injured in the crash.

On 16 August 2022, passengers departing at Oxenholme from a delayed service from London Euston were locked in at the station after staff went home early. Some passengers attempted to escape by climbing a security fence. A Network Rail worker eventually reopened the exit 45 minutes after the train arrived.

Facilities
The station is fully staffed, with the ticket office open all week (Monday - Saturday 05:45 - 19:00, Sunday 10:45 - 20:15).  A self-service ticket machine is also available in the booking hall for use outside these times and for collecting pre-paid tickets.  Waiting rooms are provided on both platforms, along with a variety of other amenities such as post box, coffee kiosk, cycle racks, toilets, shop and food/drink vending machines.  Train running information is offered via automated announcements, digital display screens and customer help points.  The subway linking the platforms and both entrances has inclined ramps and so is accessible for disabled passengers (though wheelchair users are advised to request assistance from station staff as the ramps are quite steep).

Services

Most Avanti West Coast services from London to Glasgow or Edinburgh call here to provide connections with the Windermere branch. There is normally a train at least every two hours to London (either direct or via Birmingham New Street) and every hour to Edinburgh or Glasgow. TransPennine Express services between Manchester Airport and Glasgow/Edinburgh also serve the station once per hour each way, as well as Northern services to and from Windermere. Most Windermere services start and terminate here, but some occasionally run through to Lancaster, Preston and Manchester Airport.
Oxenholme and the Windermere branch are signalled from Carlisle PSB.

References

External links

Video footage of the station

Railway stations in Cumbria
Former Lancaster and Carlisle Railway stations
Railway stations in Great Britain opened in 1847
Railway stations served by TransPennine Express
Northern franchise railway stations
Railway stations served by Avanti West Coast
1847 establishments in England
Stations on the West Coast Main Line
 DfT Category D stations